The Iron Horse Trail is a rail trail located in east-central Alberta in Canada. The 300 km-long, multiuse recreational trail is used by all-terrain vehicles and also by horses, mountain bikes, hikers, and snowmobiles, depending upon the season.

The trail occupies a former Canadian National Railway line's right-of-way from Waskatenau to Cold Lake, with an arm branching off to Heinsburg. It is part of the Trans Canada Trail.

See also
 List of rail trails

References

External links
 

Municipal District of Bonnyville No. 87
Rail trails in Alberta
Smoky Lake County
County of St. Paul No. 19